The Six Humoresques, Opp. 87 and 89, are concertante compositions for violin and orchestra written from 1917 to 1918 by the Finnish composer Jean Sibelius. Despite spanning two opus numbers (due to publishing technicalities), the composer—who originally considered calling the humoresques Impromptus or Lyrical Dances—intended them as a suite. They are:

 Humoresque No. 1 in D minor, Op. 87/1 (Commodo)
 Humoresque No. 2 in D major, Op. 87/2 (Allegro assai)
 Humoresque No. 3 in G minor, Op. 89/1 (Alla gavotta)
 Humoresque No. 4 in G minor, Op. 89/2 (Andantino)
 Humoresque No. 5 in E-flat major, Op. 89/3 (Commodo)
 Humoresque No. 6 in G minor, Op. 89/4 (Allegro)

The Six Humoresques premiered on 24 November 1919 in Helsinki, with Sibelius conducting the Helsinki Philharmonic Orchestra; the soloist was the Russian-Finnish-American violinist Paul Cherkassky. Also on the program was the definitive version of the Symphony No. 5 in E-flat major (Op. 82), as well as Song of the Earth (Op. 93), a cantata for mixed choir.

In the autumn of 1940, Sibelius revised No. 1's instrumentation (most notably, he eliminated the harp part); the original, while promised to Wilhelm Hansen in February 1917, was never published. The violinist  premiered the revised No. 1 on 15 December 1940, with Toivo Haapanen conducting the Helsinki Philharmonic Orchestra. Hansen, who had published the other five humoresques in 1923, completed the set in 1942. The 1917 version is extant.

Instrumentation
The Humoresque No. 1 is scored for the following instruments:

Soloist: violin
Woodwinds: 2 flutes, 2 oboes, 2 clarinets (in B), and 2 bassoons
Brass: 2 horns (in F)
Percussion: timpani
Strings: violins, violas, cellos, and double basses

The Humoresque No. 2 has identical scoring, except for the omission of the entire woodwind section. The Op. 89 pieces are even more delicately scored. In addition to the soloist, Humoresques Nos. 3 and 4 utilize strings only. No. 5 adds to this scoring three woodwinds: 2 flutes, 2 clarinets (in B), and 2 bassoons, while No. 6 omits the clarinets but retains the flutes and bassoons.

Recordings
The sortable table below lists commercially available recordings of the  Six Humoresques:

Notes, references, and sources

Concertos by Jean Sibelius
1917 compositions
1918 compositions